This article is a summary of 2,775 first-class cricket matches played by Somerset County Cricket Club to the end of the 2022 season.

First-Class Status
Somerset is generally regarded as a first-class team from 1882 to 1885 and from their entry into the County Championship in 1891. 

The record is complicated by a number of matches that W G Grace played for Gloucestershire against Somerset between 1879 and 1885. Wisden and Playfair recognise all of these as first-class and they are included in Grace's career figures, which have been his accepted figures since 1916 and are used in the Wikipedia article about Grace.  The earlier matches in the series are not regarded as first-class by some statisticians and this article on Somerset CCC matches does not include the matches that are in dispute. For more information about this issue, see Variations in First-Class Cricket Statistics.

Some publications also include a match organised by Somerset against Cambridge University at Cambridge in 1892. Somerset only had 10 players and enlisted two additional players (Gregor MacGregor and Norman Cooper) in what became a 12-a-side match (although only 11 players fielded). The match was retitled Cambridge University v H.T. Hewett's XII, Hewett being the captain of the visiting side. The match was won by Hewett's team.

Notes
The 23 inter-county matches played between 1882 and 1885 were before the County Championship started. All inter-county contests since 1891 have been in the Championship except for the following 8 friendly matches:

 1919 v Worcestershire at Worcester
 1919 v Worcestershire at Bath
 1948 v Glamorgan at Newport
 1949 v Glamorgan at Taunton
 1950 v Glamorgan at Cardiff (Arms Park)
 1951 v Glamorgan at Taunton
 1957 v Sussex at Bristol (Imperial)
 1957 v Sussex at Hove

Worcestershire did not compete in the Championship in 1919.

All but six of the first-class matches played by Somerset have been eleven-a-side. The six others were twelve-a-side matches played against Oxford University in 1893, 1896, 1899, 1902, 1903 and 1904. Twelve Somerset players played against the South Africans in 1912 when Harry Chidgey was replaced by Bruce Hylton-Stewart after being injured. In 1885 against Hampshire at Southampton, Somerset only had nine players.

Most first-class matches have been of three-day duration. From 1988 to 1992 six Championship matches each season were four-day matches and from 1993 all Championship matches have been of four days. The first four-day non-championship match was that against the Australians in 1997. Since then the matches against New Zealand (1999), West Indies (2000), Australians (2001), and Sri Lanka A (2004) have been four-day matches. Four matches against M.C.C. between 1882 and 1891 were two-day matches as were the 15 matches played in 1919.

Two matches played under the single-innings rule for matches which have delayed starts have ended in results, both defeats for Somerset. The 1954 victory by Yorkshire at Bradford is included as a draw while the 1986 victory by Derbyshire at Taunton is included as a defeat for Somerset. This is in line with the Championship tables at the time.

Summary against each opponent
In the following table the County Championship summary is limited to matches played from 1891. Inter-County matches played between 1882 and 1885 are listed separately as are County friendly matches. Bob Willis Trophy games are included in the County Championship totals.

The match against Oxford Universities in 2000 (which included Oxford Brookes University) is included here in the Oxford University totals. The match in 2008 against Cambridge University UCCE is included here in the Cambridge University totals.

Summary on each home ground
Currently first-class matches are only played at Taunton. Only 2 other first-class matches have been played on the following grounds. These were matches played at Taunton between East Africa and Sri Lanka, after both teams had played in the 1975 World Cup, and a West Indies A v India A match in 2018. Bob Willis Trophy games are included in the County Championship totals.

In the following table click on the 'CA' to access the Cricket Archive Records section for the ground.

Between 1882 and 1885 10 inter-county home matches were played at Taunton (3 won, 7 lost) and 1 at Bath, Lansdown CC (won). Since 1891 2 friendly inter-county home matches have been played at Taunton (2 drawn), 1 at Bath, Recreation Ground (won) and 1 at Bristol, Imperial Athletic Ground (drawn).

Season by season summary 
In the following table the final position is given together with the number of teams in the County Championship so that 5=/9 means that Somerset were equal 5th out of the 9 teams competing. From 2000 the County Championship has been divided into two divisions shown here as D1 for Division 1 and D2 for Division 2. Bob Willis Trophy games are included in the County Championship totals.

Abandoned matches
 1895 v Lancashire at Manchester
 1901 v Worcestershire at Worcester
 1903 v Hampshire at Bath
 1914 v Northamptonshire at Taunton
 1924 v Essex at Bath
 1924 v Glamorgan at Cardiff
 1968 v Derbyshire at Bath
 1977 v Derbyshire at Taunton
 1979 v Gloucestershire at Bristol
 1980 v Lancashire at Bath
 1983 v Oxford University at Oxford
 1986 v Sussex at Horsham

All these matches were abandoned because of bad weather, except for the match in 1914 which was abandoned because of the impending war.

External links
 CricketArchive list for Somerset CCC

Somerset County Cricket Club
Cricket records and statistics